Horvat Maʿon (Hebrew) or Tell Maʿin /  Khirbet el-Maʿin (Arabic) is an archaeological site located  southwest of Gaza,  southwest of Kibbutz Nirim in the Negev, the arid southern portion of Israel; in the Roman period, the site is thought to have formed the western boundary of the Limes Palaestinae. 

Others have sought to place Horvat Maon of the Negev with Beth-baal-meon and Beth-meon.

Horvat Maʿon, under the name Menois, was the capital of Saltus Constantinianus, also known as Saltus Constantiniaces, an administrative district formed by either Constantine the Great or Constantius II. 

Excavations there have uncovered the Maon Synagogue, known for its mosaics adorned with various animals and likely built around 600 CE. The date of the mosaic has been alternatively given as the first half of the 6th century, based on its style.

References

Archaeological sites in Israel
Geography of Southern District (Israel)
Hebrew Bible cities